The following is a list of all the tournaments that have been held by All Pro Wrestling.

King of the Indies Tournament

2000
The first King of the Indies tournament was held on December 30, 2000, in Galt, CA.

2001
Over the weekend of October 26–27, in Vallejo, CA, APW held the 2nd "King of the Indies" tournament, which showcased premiere independent wrestlers from across the United States. A.J. Styles, Samoa Joe, Frankie Kazarian, Doug Williams, and Spanky were among the participants in the 16-man event. "American Dragon" Bryan Danielson would ultimately be crowned "King of the Indies" after defeating Low Ki in the tournament final.

2015 
Over the weekend of March 27–28, in Vallejo, CA, APW held the 3rd "King of the Indies" tournament in collaboration with Pro Wrestling Revolution.

2018 
On July 6 , in Daly City, CA, APW held the 4th "King of the Indies" tournament in collaboration with Pro Wrestling Revolution.

2019 
On July 5 , in Daly City, CA, APW held the 4th "King of the Indies" tournament in collaboration with Pro Wrestling Revolution.

2000 Winner: Christopher Daniels (12/30/00)
2001 Winner: Bryan Danielson (10/27/01)
2015 Winner: Adam Thornstowe (3/28/2015)
2018 Winner: Dragon Lee (7/7/2018)
2019 Winner: Dragon Lee (7/6/2019)

APW Young Lions Cup Tournament

2008
December 6, 2008 – "Out of Control" Matt Carlos wins the inaugural cup in a 4-Way Elimination Match involving himself, Dan Danielson, Junior Morales, and CORVUS.

2009
April 18, 2009 – This was the first Young Lion's Cup to be contested in an 8-person single elimination tournament.

2010
April 10, 2010 – The winner of this year's tournament would not only win the Young Lion's Cup, but would also become #1 contender for the APW Worldwide Internet Championship.

2011
April 1, 2011

1.   Perry Von Vicious was awarded a bye into the Finals after APW Commissioner J.J. Perez deemed Mikey Jay unfit to compete after a post-match attack by CORVUS in the 1st round.

2012

May 5, 2012

-The 2012 Young Lions Cup Tournament is the first tournament to include 16 Competitors. The competitors were broken into 8 teams by the APW Championship Committee. Those teams would wrestle each other in single elimination format; the winning team would go on to face one another in the Quarterfinals of the Tournament.

-Results of Round One: In Round One of the 2012 APW Young Lions Cup Tournament, the team of Damien Grundy with Matthew Theall & J. R. Kratos eliminated the team of Brian Tannen & Joe DeSoul. Tenchismo & SLEDGE with CORVUS & DARKNESS were eliminated by the team of Mikey Jay & Daniel Torch. The team of Sasha Darevko & Jeff Cobb eliminated the team of Ray Rosas & Chris Cali. The team of Shoop Shellhammer and Levi Shapiro with Matthew Theall were eliminated by the team of Darren Dean & Kay Jutler. All winning teams would advance to the Quarterfinals of the Tournament.

2013

November 2, 2013

2014

October 25, 2014

The Young Lions Cup returned to its original format and was held at Halloween Hell 17. "Flyin" Ryan McQueen won the cup in a 4-Way Elimination Match involving himself, Idris Jackson, Truex and Jinxx. While being presented the cup McQueen called out and attacked his trainer former APW Universal Heavyweight Champion Adam Thornstowe.

Pick the Winner Battle Royal
2009 Winner: "The Latin Dragon" Junior Morales (1/3/09)
2010 Winner: "Out of Control" Matt Carlos (1/16/10)
2011 Winner: Corvus (1/8/11)
2012 Winner: "Big Country" Jody Kristofferson (1/14/12)
2013 Winner: "The Rock Legend Scum" Adam Thornstowe (1/5/13)

Gauntlet to the Gold
2008 Winner: Dylan Drake (10/4/08)
2009 Winner: Malachi (9/26/09)

Super Summer Series
2010 Winner: "The Boss" Derek Sanders (6/12/10)

Bracket "B" winner, Derek Sanders, defeated Bracket "A" winner, Dylan Drake in the finals to win the Super Summer Series and become #1 contender for the APW Universal Heavyweight Championship.

See also
Professional wrestling tournament

References

Professional wrestling tournaments
Professional wrestling-related lists